Sheila Vogel-Coupe (1928 – 25 November 2022) was the oldest sex worker in the United Kingdom. Some reports from 2014 stated that, at the age of 85, she was the oldest sex worker in the world.

She was born in 1928, the granddaughter of Polish-Jewish immigrants. She was widowed twice. Her first husband was Jimmy Vogel. Her second husband, Noel Coupe, an aeronautical engineer who died in 2001. She was the grandmother of The X Factor contestant Katie Waissel. Twice-widowed, Vogel-Coupe started escorting in 2010 at the age of 81. In 2014, she was entertaining up to ten clients per week at £250 an hour. Channel 4 released a documentary about her entitled My Granny the Escort, about Vogel-Coupe and two other elderly sex workers.

Vogel-Coupe died on 25 November 2022, at the age of 93.

References

1929 births
2022 deaths
Date of birth missing
Place of birth missing
English female prostitutes
English Jews
English people of Polish-Jewish descent